The 2008 Western Australian state election was held on Saturday 6 September 2008 to elect 59 members to the Legislative Assembly and 36 members to the Legislative Council. The incumbent centre-left Labor Party government, in power since the 2001 election and led since 25 January 2006 by Premier Alan Carpenter, was defeated by the centre-right Liberal Party opposition, led by Opposition Leader Colin Barnett since 6 August 2008.

The election resulted in a hung parliament with no party gaining a majority. Labor was two seats short of a majority in the expanded legislature.  Ultimately, the Liberals were able to form a coalition government with the WA Nationals, supported by three independents.  While both parties agreed to National demands that at least 25 percent of mining proceeds go to regional projects, the Nationals ultimately went with the Liberals.  According to Nationals leader Brendon Grylls, a Labor-National coalition would have required Green support to get mining legislation passed in the Legislative Council.  The coalition agreement gave National Party ministers "the right to exempt [themselves] from Cabinet and vote against an issue on the floor of the Parliament if it's against the wishes of the people [they] represent", an explicit rejection of the pattern of former non-Labor coalition agreements under which the Nationals had been seen as virtual co-owners of Liberal policies.

The election was the first to be held since a major electoral redistribution was implemented in 2007. This redistribution involved significant changes to the geographic distribution of parliamentary seats and regions in Western Australia, and brought the state into line with the rest of Australia in adopting one vote one value for the lower house.

The election was called earlier than expected by Alan Carpenter, who requested the Governor to dissolve parliament on 7 August 2008.

Results

Legislative Assembly

|}

Legislative Council

|}

Summary of results

Seats changing hands

 Members listed in italics did not contest their seat at this election.
 * Kalgoorlie's first margin figure is Liberal vs. Labor
 ** Kalgoorlie's second margin figure is Independent vs. National

Background

Electoral changes
The 2008 election takes place with entirely new boundaries determined in a redistribution finalised on 29 October 2007 by the Western Australian Electoral Commission. Prior to the redistribution, the Electoral Act 1907, which governs elections in the state, specified that the metropolitan region which includes Perth and its suburbs, was to be divided into 34 Assembly districts or 60% of the seats, while the rest of the state was to be divided into 23 or 40% of the seats. However, at the 2006 census, taken on 8 August 2006, 73.76% of Western Australians lived in the metropolitan region. This meant that each member of the Legislative Assembly, as at 30 September 2007, was representing either 28,519 metropolitan voters or 14,551 country voters.

One vote one value had long been sought by the Labor Party, that party claiming to be disadvantaged by the familiar reality that country constituencies have tended to elect non-Labor members. The Burke Labor government (1983–1988), with the conditional support of the National Party, managed to achieve limited reform—through the Acts Amendment (Electoral Reform) Act 1987—in increasing the metropolitan quota from 29 to 34, redesigning the Legislative Council (or Upper House) into a Senate-style body with six uneven multi-member seats filled by a system of STV proportional representation, and creating a permanent, funded Electoral Commission as a body fully independent from Parliament and the executive. Between Burke's retirement from politics in 1988 and Labor's election loss five years later, the government faced a hostile upper house, considerable distractions by way of the WA Inc royal commission and, after 1991, was a minority government unable to achieve further electoral reform.

Following Labor's win at the 2001 election, the new premier Geoff Gallop and attorney-general Jim McGinty were committed to implementing 'one vote, one value'. By this time, all other states and territories had eliminated electoral malapportionment. Unlike their predecessors, they could count on the support of half of the upper-house members for passage of the electoral legislation but, as the proposed legislation involved constitutional change, an absolute majority of the members was necessary. The Government went to the High Court in 2003 to determine whether the Legislative Council president's casting vote could be used to obtain the majority, but the High Court answered that it could not. Change occurred, however, when the Liberal Party, which staunchly opposed the reform, failed to preselect one of their North Metropolitan MLCs, Alan Cadby, in a bid to get Peter Collier into the Legislative Council at the 2005 election. Cadby resigned from the Liberal Party and completed his term as an Independent, consenting to Labor's electoral legislation with some amendments. On 20 May 2005, just before newly elected upper-house members were to take their places, the Electoral Amendment and Repeal Act 2005 (No.1 of 2005) passed.

The passage of the Electoral Reform (Electoral Funding) Act 2006 into law on 26 October 2006 means that, for the first time, candidates, parties and Legislative Council groups will be able to receive public funding based on their performance in terms of votes at the election as well as a refund of their nomination deposit if they receive over 4% of the primary vote, as is the case in several other states and in federal elections. The rate for the 2008 election has been set at $1.56888 per vote. The legislation, which was Attorney-General Jim McGinty's second attempt to introduce the measure, was explicitly based on the 1992 reforms of Queensland's Electoral Act and was intended to improve accountability and increase candidates' immunity, or perceived immunity, from outside influences. Prior to the 2008 election, candidates could receive a refund of their nomination deposit only if they achieved 10% of the total primary vote. Earlier similar legislation had failed in November 2003, despite an in-principle agreement with then opposition leader Colin Barnett, owing to Liberal backbench opposition and a campaign against the proposal by the West Australian newspaper, which termed the measure as a 'poll tax'.

The electoral system

The Western Australian Legislative Assembly has a total of 59 seats, up from 57 in the last parliament. The last increase in seats, from 55 to 57, occurred before the 1983 election. Since the enactment of the Electoral Act 1907, each seat is filled by a single member selected using instant-runoff preferential voting. In order for a valid vote to be cast, voters must number all candidates on the ballot paper in the order of their preference as with Australian House of Representatives elections. At the election, 42 of the seats are located in the metropolitan area, 12 in the Agricultural and South West regions, and 5 in the Mining and Pastoral region in the north and east of the state. Seats in the Mining and Pastoral region are permitted to be under quota on account of their significant geographical size, but all other seats have a quota of 21,350 voters with a maximum variance of 10%.

The Western Australian Legislative Council, sometimes referred to as the 'upper house', consists of 36 members, with 6 elected from each of 6 multi-member regions (also known as constituencies). The system used for voting is known as Single transferable vote, which is a variant of the proportional representation system.  The ballot paper (voting form), traditionally printed on pink coloured paper, is divided into two sections.  The voter casts a vote in either one of two ways – by writing the numeral "1" on the left hand side corresponding to the party of choice, or by numbering all candidates on the right hand side of the form according to his/her preference. If the voter chooses the first method, the vote is then counted according to the publicly known preference listing for the party chosen by the voter. The same voting system is used for electing members to the Australian Senate.

Members of the Legislative Council, unlike those in the Legislative Assembly, hold their seats for a fixed term of four years.  They take their seats in the house on 22 May following the date of their election.  The Legislative Council is not dissolved prior to the end of each four-year term, even if a general election is held several months prior to the end of the term. For this reason, members elected to the Legislative Council in the 2008 election did not take their seats until May 2009.

Counting the votes

More than 100,000 electors (7.5% of the electorate) cast their votes prior to election day, either by post or in person. Checking the eligibility of these votes commences 3 days prior to election day at the Count Centre in Fremantle. After the close of polls at 6:00 pm, ballot boxes are emptied and a provisional count of ordinary votes is conducted at each of the 800 polling places. Preliminary results are telephoned to District and Regional Returning Officers, who forward aggregated results to the Tally Room at ABC's East Perth studios.

Election night results are provisional for several reasons. Firstly, there is insufficient time to conduct a full distribution of voter preferences in those Legislative Assembly seats that require it. The official count for all Assembly districts does not commence till after the closing date for postal votes which is the Thursday following the election. Secondly, only ticket votes and first-preference votes for candidates on non-ticket ballots for the Legislative Council are counted on election night, providing only a notional distribution for each region. The high proportion of early votes cast in this election along with the large number of absentee votes cast on election day (caused by elector confusion arising from the recent changes to electoral boundaries) was expected to delay the determination of final results, particularly in closely fought seats.

Legislative Council ballot papers and all declaration (absentee and provisional) votes cast on election day are delivered to the Count Centre on Sunday where the official count of these votes continues for 7–10 days. Ticket votes are sorted (ticket/non-ticket/informal) then manually counted, while preferences on non-ticket ballots are entered into a computer database under the scrutiny of party officials. The ticket vote results are added to the full preference results and the final result determined. Finally, all Legislative Assembly votes are officially counted by each District Returning Officer who then declares (announces) the successful candidate for the particular district.

Key dates
 Issue of writ: 6 pm, 7 August
 Nominations open: 8 August
 Close of nominations: 12 noon, 15 August
 Close of rolls: 6 pm, 15 August
 Postal voting commences: 18 August
 Pre-poll voting commences: 19 August
 Polling day: 6 September
 Return of writ: On or before 4 November

Candidates

Polling 
Newspoll polling was conducted via random telephone number selection in city and country areas. Sampling sizes normally consist of around 800–900 electors, with the 10 – 14 August poll consisting of 1088 electors, and the 2 – 4 September poll consisting of 1802 electors. The margin of error was around ±3.5 percent, while the 2 – 4 September poll had a declared margin of error of ±2.3 percent.

References

External links 

Western Australian Electoral Commission
Main site – 2008 WA election – ABC Elections
Pendulum – 2008 WA election – ABC Elections
2007 redistribution – 2008 WA election – ABC Elections

Elections in Western Australia
2008 elections in Australia
2000s in Western Australia
September 2008 events in Australia